Hippodamia quinquesignata, the five-spotted lady beetle, is a species of lady beetle in the family Coccinellidae. It is found in North America.

Subspecies
These four subspecies belong to the species Hippodamia quinquesignata:
 Hippodamia quinquesignata ambigua LeConte, 1852
 H. q. ambigua is usually, but not always, spotless. This subspecies is generally found west of the Sierra Nevada. 
 Hippodamia quinquesignata coccinea Casey
 Hippodamia quinquesignata punctulata LeConte, 1852
 Hippodamia quinquesignata quinquesignata (Kirby, 1837)

References

Further reading

External links

 

Coccinellidae
Articles created by Qbugbot
Beetles described in 1837
Beetles of North America